Campobello may refer to:
 Campobello, South Carolina
 Campobello di Mazara, Sicily, Italy
 Campobello di Licata, Sicily, Italy
 Campobello Island, New Brunswick

People with the surname
 Gloria Campobello (1911–1968), Mexican ballet dancer and choreographer
 Nellie Campobello (1900–1986), Mexican writer, ballet dancer and choreographer

See also
 Roosevelt Campobello International Park
 Sunrise at Campobello

Italian-language surnames